Sergi Bruguera was the defending champion, but lost in the final to Thomas Muster. The score was 7–6(7–2), 7–5.

Seeds

Draw

Finals

Top half

Bottom half

References

External links
 Official results archive (ATP)
 Official results archive (ITF)

Campionati Internazionali di Sicilia
1993 ATP Tour
Camp